Bogoljub Nedeljković (1920–1986) served as Chairman of the Executive Council of the Socialist Autonomous Province of Kosovo within the former Yugoslavia from May 1974 to May 1978.  He was succeeded in office by Bahri Oruçi.

Yugoslav politicians
People from Prizren
1920 births
1986 deaths